Sławomir Orzeł (born 1979) is a Polish strongman competitor and bodybuilder who is known by the nickname Max. He lives in Karwieńskie Błota in Gmina Krokowa.

Strongman achievements
2004
Poland vs IFSA Baltic Team – 2nd
2005
Poland's Strongest Man – 4th
2007
Poland's Strongest Man 2007 – 5th

External links
 Official website (Polish)

1979 births
Living people
Polish strength athletes
Professional bodybuilders
Polish bodybuilders
People from Puck County
Sportspeople from Pomeranian Voivodeship